"Talk Is Cheap" is a song by Australian musician Chet Faker, released through Future Classic on 11 February 2014 as the lead single from his debut studio album Built on Glass (2014). It was voted number one on Australian youth broadcaster Triple J's Hottest 100 of 2014 and received a nomination for Australian Video of the Year at the 2014 J Awards.

The song was shortlisted for Song of the Year at the APRA Music Awards of 2015.

Commercial performance
"Talk Is Cheap" debuted on the ARIA Singles Chart at number 82 on 17 February 2014 and peaked at number 34 two weeks later. After his live performance at the ARIA Music Awards of 2014 on 26 November 2014, the song reached a new peak of 31. On 26 January 2015, the song was voted number one on radio station Triple J's Hottest 100 of 2014 and following this achievement, "Talk Is Cheap" reached a new peak of number 6. The song has been certified Platinum by the Australian Recording Industry Association for shipments exceeding 70,000 copies.

Music video
A music video to accompany the release of "Talk Is Cheap" was first released on YouTube on 11 February 2014 at a total length of three minutes and thirty-nine seconds. Directed by Toby & Pete, it was nominated for Best Video at the ARIA Music Awards of 2014, but lost to "Chandelier" by Sia.

Track listing

Charts

Weekly charts

Year-end charts

Certifications

Release history

References

2014 singles
2014 songs
Chet Faker songs